Diplodactylus mitchelli, sometimes called commonly the Pilbara stone gecko, is a species of lizard in the family Diplodactylidae. The species is endemic to Australia.

Etymology
The specific name, mitchelli, is in honor of Australian herpetologist Francis John Mitchell.

Geographic range
D. mitchelli is found in the North West Cape and Pilbara regions of Western Australia.

Reproduction
D. mitchelli is oviparous

References

Further reading
Cogger HG (2014). Reptiles and Amphibians of Australia, Seventh Edition. Clayton, Victoria, Australia: CSIRO Publishing. xxx + 1,033 pp. .
Kluge AG (1963). "Three new species of the Gekkonid Lizard genus Diplodactylus Gray from Australia". Records of the South Australian Museum 14: 545-553 + Plates 34–35. (Diplodactylus mitchelli, new species, pp. 548–550 + Plate 34, figure B).
Wilson, Steve; Swan, Gerry (2013). A Complete Guide to Reptiles of Australia, Fourth Edition. Sydney: New Holland Publishers. 522 pp. .

mitchelli
Geckos of Australia
Endemic fauna of Australia
Taxa named by Arnold G. Kluge
Reptiles described in 1963